This is a list of fantasy films released in the 2020s. Films listed include live action and animated.

List

Forthcoming

References 

2020s
Lists of 2020s films by genre